Niko Kallela (born July 2, 1991) is a Finnish professional ice hockey player who is currently playing for KalPa in the SM-liiga.

See also
Ice hockey in Finland

References

External links

1991 births
Finnish ice hockey forwards
KalPa players
Living people
Ice hockey people from Tampere